Fawkes is a surname of Norman-French origin, first appearing in the British Isles after the Norman Conquest of England in 1066. The surname may be a corruption of the Norman surname Vaux, which means valley. Notably, Guy Fawkes was sometimes recorded as Guy Vaux. An alternative origin for the surname is that it originates from the pre-6th century Germanic given name of Falco (later Faulques) meaning "falcon". The first recorded spelling of the surname in England is that of one Geoffrey Faukes in 1221.

It is also, less frequently, a given name.

People

Surname
 Barbara Fawkes (1914–2002), British nurse and nursing educator
 Francis Fawkes (1721–1777), English poet and translator
 Frederick Fawkes (1870–1936), British Conservative Party politician
 George Fawkes (1903-1967), British admiral
 Guy Fawkes (1570–1606), English revolutionary
 Isaac Fawkes (1675?-1732), English conjurer and showman
 John Fawkes (born 1933), English cricketer
 Marion Fawkes (born 1948), First official female racewalking world champion
 Randol Fawkes (1924–2000), Bahamian civil rights activist, author, musician
 Richard Fawkes (born 1944), British writer and director
 Wally Fawkes (1924–2023), British-Canadian jazz clarinetist and cartoonist
 Walter Fawkes (1769–1825), British landowner and politician, patron of painter J. M. W. Turner
 Wilmot Fawkes (1846–1926), Royal Navy officer, Commander-in-Chief, Plymouth

Given name
 Fawkes de Breauté, (died 1226), Anglo-Norman soldier who served in the First Barons' War

Pseudonym
 Guido Fawkes, a pseudonym of British right-wing political blogger Paul Staines

Fictional characters
 Jamison Fawkes (aka Junkrat), playable character in the 2016 video game Overwatch
 Darien Fawkes, main character of the television series The Invisible Man
 Fawkes, Dumbledore's phoenix in the Harry Potter books
 Fawkes, on the web series The Guild, portrayed by Wil Wheaton
 Fawkes, a Super Mutant character from the 2008 video game Fallout 3

Others
 Fawkes (image cloaking software) - a free software meant to defeat face recognition by AI software

See also 
 Vaulx (disambiguation)
 Vaux (disambiguation)

References

Surnames of British Isles origin